The Cumberland River is a perennial river of the Corangamite catchment, located in the Otways region of the Australian state of Victoria.

Location and features

From its highest point, the river descends  over its  course.

Etymology

The river was probably named by surveyor George Smythe in 1846, either for the Duke of Cumberland or for the schooner  in which Charles Grimes explored Port Phillip and King Island in 1802 – 03.

See also

 List of rivers of Victoria

References

External links

 

Corangamite catchment
Rivers of Barwon South West (region)
Otway Ranges